The Pirate Party is a small political party in Morocco which was founded in 2011. It is one of the first Pirate parties in the African continent, second to the Tunisian Pirate Party.

The party is formed by several youth activists and isn't recognised yet by the Moroccan law.

References

External links
Official website

2011 establishments in Morocco
Morocco
Political parties established in 2011
Political parties in Morocco